Zaccaria della Vecchia (died 1625) was a Roman Catholic prelate who served as Bishop of Torcello (1618–1625).

Biography
On 14 May 1618, Zaccaria della Vecchia was appointed during the papacy of Pope Paul V as Bishop of Torcello.
On 20 May 1618, he was consecrated bishop by Giovanni Garzia Mellini, Cardinal-Priest of Santi Quattro Coronati, with Paolo De Curtis, Bishop Emeritus of Isernia, and Giovanni Battista Lancellotti, Bishop of Nola. serving as co-consecrators. 
He served as Bishop of Torcello until his death in 1625.

References

External links and additional sources
 (for Chronology of Bishops) 
 (for Chronology of Bishops) 

17th-century Roman Catholic bishops in the Republic of Venice
Bishops appointed by Pope Paul V
1625 deaths